The Mexico national under-20 football team represents Mexico in association football at the under-20 age level, and is controlled by the Mexican Football Federation (FMF), the governing body of football in Mexico.

The team has won the CONCACAF Under-20 Championship a record thirteen times across its various formats. Mexico's best finish came at the 1977 FIFA World Youth Championship, the first ever edition of a FIFA-sanctioned youth tournament. They also managed a third-place finish at the 2011 edition.

Competitive record

FIFA World Cup record

Honours
Major competitions

FIFA U-20 World Cup
 Runners-up (1): 1977
 Third Place (1): 2011
 CONCACAF Under-20 Championship
 Winners (13): 1962, 1970, 1973, 1974, 1976, 1978, 1980, 1984, 1990, 1992, 2011, 2013, 2015
 Runners-up (3): 1988, 1996, 2018

Other competitions

 Pan American Games
 Third Place (1): 2007
 Revelations Cup
 Winners (2): 2021, 2022
 Central American and Caribbean Games
 Winners (1): 2014
 Runner-up (3): 1993, 1998, 2002
 Copa Presidente de la República
 Winners (1): 2011
 Beijing Hyundai International Youth Football Tournament
 Runner-up (1): 2012
 Milk Cup
 Winners (3): 2001, 2012, 2013
 Lev Yashin Cup
 Winners (1): 2012
 ADO Den Haag Tournament
 Winners (1): 59th ADO Den Haag Tournament

Individual awards
 FIFA U-20 World Cup

Results and fixtures

The following matches have been played within the past 12 months.

2022

Players

Current squad
The following players were called up for the 2022 CONCACAF Men's U20 Championship.

Player records

Top goalscorers

Managers

See also
 Mexico national football team
 Mexico national under-23 football team
 Mexico national under-17 football team
 Mexico women's national football team
 Mexico national beach football team
 Mexico national futsal team

References

North American national under-20 association football teams
Football